INS Karwar (M67) of the Karwar subclass was a s that was in service with the Indian Navy till 2012, built by the Sredne-Nevskiy Shipyard at Saint Petersburg in Russia except for the addition of surface-to-air missiles.

INS Karwar was the first of the Natya-class minesweepers acquired from the USSR. She was commissioned on 14 July 1986 in Riga (USSR) under the command of Commander RK Sinha. The ship operated from Vishakhapatnam till 2013 after which she was based at Mumbai. Her crew consisted of six officers and 90 sailors, INS Karwar had the motto Hamesha Tayyar ("Always ready"). The last commanding officer was Cdr Kaushik Dhar.

Karwar was decommissioned on 9 May 2017. The decommissioning left the country with only four minesweepers.

References

Pondicherry-class minesweepers
Ships built in the Soviet Union
India–Soviet Union relations
1986 ships
Ships built at Sredne-Nevskiy Shipyard